Blumhouse Productions (also known as BH Productions or simply BH) is an American film and television production company founded in 2000 by Jason Blum. 

It is known mainly for producing horror films, such as Paranormal Activity, Insidious, The Purge, Split, Get Out, Happy Death Day, Halloween, Us, The Invisible Man, Freaky, The Black Phone and M3GAN. It has also produced drama films, such as Whiplash and BlacKkKlansman, which both earned nominations for the Academy Award for Best Picture. Get Out and BlacKkKlansman won Academy Awards for Best Original Screenplay and Best Adapted Screenplay, respectively.

It has worked with directors such as Leigh Whannell, Jordan Peele, Scott Derrickson, Christopher Landon, James Wan, Mike Flanagan, James DeMonaco, Jeff Wadlow, Damien Chazelle, and M. Night Shyamalan.

Most of Blumhouse's theatrically-released films since 2014 are owned and distributed by Universal Pictures as part of a 10-year first-look deal.

Overview

Film 
Blumhouse's company model is to produce films on a small budget, give directors creative freedom, and release films widely through the studio system. Blumhouse was originally known as Blum Israel Productions, with Amy Israel with a first-look deal at Miramax when the company was founded. In 2002, Blum and Israel parted ways, and the company became Blumhouse Productions. In 2015, Crypt TV was created by Jack Davis and Eli Roth which is backed by Blum and the company.

Blumhouse's low-budget model began in 2007 with Paranormal Activity, which was made for $15,000 and grossed over $193 million worldwide. It produced Insidious, which grossed over $100 million worldwide on a budget of $1.5 million; and Sinister, which grossed over $87 million worldwide from a budget of $3 million.

In 2010, Haunted Movies was formed as a division for Blumhouse which released Insidious, The River, The Bay and The Lords of Salem.

In 2013, it produced The Purge, Insidious: Chapter 2, and Dark Skies.

In 2014, it produced Paranormal Activity: The Marked Ones, The Purge: Anarchy, Jessabelle, Ouija and Whiplash.

In 2015, it produced Unfriended, Insidious: Chapter 3, The Gift and The Visit.

In 2016, it produced The Purge: Election Year and Ouija: Origin of Evil.

In 2017, it produced Split, Get Out and Happy Death Day.

In 2018, it produced Insidious: The Last Key, Truth or Dare, The First Purge, and Halloween. Blumhouse announced a partnership with DreamWorks Animation to co-produce Spooky Jack but the film was removed from DreamWorks Animation's slate in 2019.

In 2019, it produced Glass, Happy Death Day 2U, Us, Ma, and Black Christmas.

In 2020, it produced Fantasy Island, The Invisible Man, The Hunt, You Should Have Left, The Craft: Legacy, Nocturne, and Freaky.

In 2021, it produced The Forever Purge, Halloween Kills and Paranormal Activity: Next of Kin.

In 2022, it produced Dashcam, The Black Phone, Mr. Harrigan's Phone, Halloween Ends, Run Sweetheart Run, Soft & Quiet and Nanny.

On November 16, 2022, it was announced that James Wan's Atomic Monster Productions was in talks to merge with Blumhouse with Atomic Monster having a shared first look deal with Universal Pictures. Both companies would continue to operate as separate labels, with each maintaining its own creative autonomy and brand identity.

In 2023, they released M3GAN, and will later release Insidious: Fear the Dark, They Listen and The Exorcist. They are also in production for an untitled Five Nights at Freddy's film.

Television, video games, books, podcasts, and haunted houses 
In 2012, Blumhouse opened the Blumhouse of Horrors, an interactive haunted house experience in Downtown Los Angeles.
It had also collaborated with Halloween Horror Nights to bring mazes, a terror tram, and scare zones from films and properties such as Insidious, The Purge, Happy Death Day, Sinister, Truth or Dare, Unfriended, Us, Freaky, The Black Phone, M3GAN and Crypt TV.

In November 2014, it launched Blumhouse Books, to publish original horror and thriller novels.

In February 2023, it launched Blumhouse Games to produce and publish original horror-themed video games for console, PC and mobile devices as part longer-term effort to branch out into interactive media. The division would join up with independent developers and focus on games with budgets of under $10 million. It would offer financing and help with creative input. The company appointed Zach Wood as President and Don Sechler as CFO of the new venture. No specific projects were discussed at the time of the announcement.

BH Tilt

BH Tilt was established on September 9, 2014, to produce movies from Blumhouse and other filmmakers for multi-platform release. On September 7, 2017, Blumhouse partnered up with distribution company Neon to manage BH Tilt. BH Tilt's releases are The Green Inferno, The Darkness, Incarnate, The Resurrection of Gavin Stone, The Belko Experiment, Sleight, Lowriders, Birth of the Dragon, Upgrade, Unfriended: Dark Web and Don't Let Go.

See also 
 Dark Castle Entertainment
 Ghost House Pictures
 Gold Circle Films
 Platinum Dunes
 Twisted Pictures
 Bloody Disgusting

References

External links 
 

Film production companies of the United States
Film distributors of the United States
Television production companies of the United States
Mass media companies established in 2000
2000 establishments in California
American companies established in 2000
Entertainment companies based in California
Companies based in Los Angeles